The FIBT World Championships 2005 took place in Calgary, Alberta, Canada for the fourth time, doing so previously in 1992 (Skeleton), 1996, and 2001 (Women's bobsleigh and men's and women's skeleton).

Bobsleigh

Two man

Source:

Four man

Source:

Two woman

Source:

Skeleton

Men

Women

Medal table

References

 
 
 
 
 

2005 in bobsleigh
IBSF World Championships
2005 in skeleton
International sports competitions hosted by Canada
2015 in Canadian sports
Bobsleigh in Canada